Kristie Fiegen is a Republican politician from South Dakota and Vice Chairman of the South Dakota Public Utilities Commission.  From 1994 to 2001, she served in the South Dakota House of Representatives.

Biography
Fiegen was born on September 17, 1962. She grew up on a farm in Chancellor, South Dakota. She graduated in Commercial Economics and Agricultural Business from South Dakota State University, and received a Master's degree in Business Administration from the University of South Dakota.

She served as South Dakota area representative for the National Multiple Sclerosis Society for nine years and as a sales representative for Monsanto Company. Since 1994, she has served as President of the South Dakota chapter of Junior Achievement. From 1999 to 2001, she served on the Xcel Energy South Dakota Advisory Board.

From 1994 to 2001, she served in the South Dakota House of Representatives. On August 9, 2011, in the wake of Steve Kolbeck's resignation, she was appointed Vice Chairman of the South Dakota Public Utilities Commission by Governor Dennis Daugaard.

Personal life
She has been involved with the Rotary Club, the United Way and Toastmasters. She is a Baptist. She is married with two children, Alex and Jackson Fiegen, and she lives in Sioux Falls, South Dakota. Her husband, Dr Tim Fiegen, is a Professor of Education at Dakota State University.

References

1962 births
Baptists from South Dakota
Living people
Republican Party members of the South Dakota House of Representatives
Politicians from Sioux Falls, South Dakota
South Dakota State University alumni
University of South Dakota alumni
Women state legislators in South Dakota
21st-century American women